Anton is a village in western Bulgaria, part of Sofia Province. It is the administrative centre of Anton Municipality, which lies in the easternmost part of Sofia Province. Anton is situated in the Zlatitsa–Pirdop Valley, 80 kilometres east of the capital Sofia. The village is the only place in the eponymous municipality, which has an area of 76 square kilometres and includes the Vartopa area, part of the Central Balkan National Park. Anton's old name was Ladzhene (Лъджене).

A notable sight in the area is the Elenska Basilica, a partially preserved imposing Late Roman or early Byzantine (5th-6th century) Christian basilica.

Anton is one of the few settlements with an Aromanian population in Bulgaria.

Demography

Ethnicity
According to the 2011 Bulgarian census, 87.99% of the population of Anton are Bulgarians, 2.31% are Gypsies, 0.18% are Turks and 0.5% were others. Some 9% of the population did not declare their ethnicity.

Anton is one of the few settlements in Bulgaria where the Aromanians live. The Aromanian minority of this country is small, composed of around 2,000 to 3,000 people nationwide.

Religion
According to the latest Bulgarian census of 2011, the religious composition, among those who answered the optional question on religious identification, was the following:

References

Villages in Sofia Province
Aromanian settlements in Bulgaria